The 1976 Indiana gubernatorial election was held on November 2, 1976. Incumbent Republican Governor Otis Bowen defeated Democratic nominee Larry A. Conrad with 56.85% of the vote.

Primary elections
Primary elections were held on May 4, 1976.

Democratic primary

Candidates
Larry A. Conrad, Secretary of State
Jack L. New, State Treasurer
Robert J. Fair, State Senator

Results

Republican primary

Candidates
Otis Bowen, incumbent Governor

Results

General election

Candidates
Larry Conrad, Democratic
Otis Bowen, Republican 
Daniel P. Talbot, American, pastor of the Church of God, Plymouth
Samuel L. Washington, U.S. Labor

Results

References

Bibliography
 
 

1976
Indiana
Gubernatorial
November 1976 events in the United States